The Kim Jong-un National Defense University is a university located in Ryongsong-guyok, Pyongyang, North Korea. The university focuses on the scientific and technical training of North Korea's national defense personnel.

History 
The university was founded by Kim Il-sung in October 1964 as the National Defense College (Korean: 국방대학). It was initially located in Kanggye, Chagang Province. The college was soon renamed as the National Defense University (Korean: 국방종합대학). The university was transferred to Pyongyang in 2000. In June 2016, Kim Jong-un visited the National Defense University where he said that he would turn it into the most prestigious university for training national defense science personnel. The name of the university was changed to include Kim Jong-un's name following his visit. In 2020, the university participated in the Party Foundation Day military parade for the first time. The school dean was put in charge of the school's preparation for the parade and a former soldier with "relevant experience" served as flag bearer for the KJU University colour.

National defense role 
According to Kim Jong-un, the National Defense University deals with scientific and technical problems on the modernization of North Korea's armed forces and the development of high-tech weapons. Kim also mentioned that the university has a role in consolidating the country's status as a nuclear weapon state.

The June 13 Information Technology Company is affiliated with the university.

References

Military academies
Universities in North Korea
Education in Pyongyang
Buildings and structures in Pyongyang
Educational institutions established in 1945
1945 establishments in Korea
Military education and training in North Korea